Merv is a city in Turkmenistan.

Merv is also a nickname for Mervin or Mervyn:

People
Merv Batt, birth name of professional wrestler Steve Rickard
Merv Connors (1914–2006), American baseball player
Merv Cross, Australian rugby league player
Merv Denton (1919–1980), Australian rugby league player
Merv Everett (1917–1988), Australian politician and judge
Merv Gordon, New Zealand association footballer
Merv Griffin (1925–2007), American TV personality
Merv Harvey (1918–1995), Australian cricketer
Merv Hicks (born 1943), Welsh rugby union and rugby league player
Merv Hobbs (born 1942), Australian rules footballer
Merv Hughes (born 1961), Australian cricketer
Merv Hunter (1926–2013), Australian politician
Merv Jackson, American basketball player
Merv Johnson (born 1923), Canadian politician
Merv Krakau (born 1951), American National Football League player
Merv Leitch (1926–1990), Canadian politician
Merv McIntosh (1922–2010), Australian rules footballer
Merv Mosely (born 1966), American football player
Merv Neagle (1958–2012), Australian rules footballer
Merv Pregulman (1922–2012), American National Football League player
Merv Rettenmund (born 1943), American baseball player
Merv Richards (1930–2018), New Zealand pole vaulter
Merv Rose, Australian tennis player
Merv Rylance, Australian rugby union player
Merv Shea (1900–1953), American baseball player
Merv Tweed (born 1955), Canadian politician
Merv Wallace (1916–2008), New Zealand cricketer
Merv Warren, American musician and record producer
Merv Wellington (1940–2003), New Zealand politician
Merv Wood, Australian rower

Fictional characters
Merv Pumpkinhead, in Neil Gaiman's The Sandman series
"Merv the Perv", a recurring character on Saturday Night Live

Other uses 
 Merv (East Syrian Ecclesiastical Province), historical region
 Minimum Efficiency Reporting Value (MERV), a measurement scale for the effectiveness of air filters

Hypocorisms